Monica Castelino is an Indian actress, who has primarily appeared in the Hindi film industry. After portraying the lead role in the Tamil film Minsara Kanna (1999), Monica appeared in glamorous roles in Hindi films throughout the 2000s. In the 2010s, she worked on several Hindi television shows including on The Kapil Sharma Show (2017).

Career
After portraying a supporting role as the protagonist's sister in the Hindi film Kaalia (1997), Monica made her debut in a lead role through K. S. Ravikumar's 1999 Tamil romantic thriller film Minsara Kanna, appearing opposite Vijay in a leading role. Simran was the first choice to play as lady lead, but due to her other commitments she opted out and Monica was subsequently signed on. She shot with the team in Chennai, Switzerland and Germany, notably filming the "Un Per Solla" song in the Alps. The film opened to average reviews and collections at the box office, with the actress gaining mixed reviews for her work. She briefly changed her stage name to Anjani for numerological reasons, before reverting to Monica.

Failure to get further opportunities saw Monica play a glamorous lead role in a low budget Hindi adult film Kama Sundari, before playing a similar supporting role in Meri Partigya, which had Mithun Chakraborty in the lead role. She was later seen in an item number in Shikaar (2004), performing a club dance song in the climax of the film. In 2004, she signed on to work on Men Not Allowed where she portrayed a lesbian woman in love with a woman portrayed by Payal Rohatgi. She then continued to play glamorous roles in Hindi films in the late 2000s.

In the 2010s, Monica moved on to portray roles in television serials and notably featured in Tu Mere Agal Bagal Hai (2014), Dr. Madhumati On Duty (2016) and Gupp Chupp (2016) in lead roles. She regularly also worked on shows produced by Optimystix Entertainment. In 2017, she joined the Hindi comedy programme, The Kapil Sharma Show, as a regular cast member.

Personal life
Monica Castelino was married to an indian actor Married to Megastar Sidhant Mohapatra .

Filmography
Feature films

Television

References

External links

Actresses from Mumbai
Actresses in Tamil cinema
Indian film actresses
Living people
20th-century Indian actresses
21st-century Indian actresses
1982 births